Malankotta devasthanam is an ancient pilgrimage centre in Anicadu village. This place is related Vaipur 
Mmahadeva temple.

Hindu temples in Pathanamthitta district